Ing Hay (also known as Doc Hay;  – 1952), was a doctor of traditional Chinese medicine and an early Chinese American who immigrated to the United States in 1887. He was known in Oregon for treating patients with herbal remedies, and for being a partner in the Kam Wah Chung Company Building.

Early life 
Ing was born in Taishan county of Guangdong province, China.

Immigration to the US 
Initially hoping to find success as a gold miner, Ing entered the United States in 1883 with his father. The pair moved to Walla Walla, Washington in 1885, before Ing's father returned to China in 1887 and Ing moved to John Day, Oregon alone. By that time, the region's gold rush had ended, and most of the local Chinese population left. It was then that Ing met Lung On. In 1888, they purchased the Kam Wah Chung Company Building.

Death 
Ing fell and broke his hip in 1948, and died four years later.

References 

1862 births
1952 deaths
People from Guangdong